Air Age Media Inc, based in Wilton, Connecticut is the largest multimedia publisher of information for enthusiasts of radio-control cars, planes, helicopters and boats.  In addition to seven market-leading magazines devoted to RC aviation and die-cast models, Air Age produces a full line of products including books, special issues, DVDs, a network of 12 websites and RCX, the world's largest radio control expo.  Air Age Media’s network of category-leading magazines reaches about 125,000 readers/month across the full age spectrum, from young action-sports fans to seasoned modelers.

Air Age Media was founded in 1929, as a family business by George C. Johnson in New York City with the launch of Model Airplane News. Air Age Media is still family owned and operated in Wilton, CT.

Publications

Radio Control
Model Airplane News
Radio Control Car Action
Backyard Fyer
Radio Control Helicopter
RC Boat Modeler
X Nitro RC

Diecast
Die Cast X

Aviation
Flight Journal

External links
Air Age Media
Radio Control Car Action magazine
The Radio Control Show

Companies based in Fairfield County, Connecticut
Publishing companies of the United States
Publishing companies established in 1929
Aviation mass media
1929 establishments in New York City